Anthill: A Novel is a 2010 novel by the biologist Edward O. Wilson. His first extended work of fiction, it won the Chicago Tribunes Heartland Prize for fiction.

Anthill, set in the US state of Alabama, follows protagonist Raff Semmes, who sets out to save the Nokobee wilderness from developers. The novel explores a concurrent civil war between rival ant colonies struggling to dominate the riverine wilderness.

References

External links
 Life Lessons, Taught by Insects. The New York Times. Accessed 2011-11-09.

2010 American novels
Fictional ants
Novels set in Alabama
Works by E. O. Wilson
Novels about animals
2010 debut novels
Entomological literature
W. W. Norton & Company books